Yolk in the Fur is the second studio album by American band Wild Pink. It was released in July 2018 by Tiny Engines.

Accolades

Track listing

References

2018 albums
Tiny Engines albums
Wild Pink albums